"I Dare You" is the second single from Shinedown's second album, Us and Them. It reached number two on the US Billboard Mainstream Rock chart, and was a minor crossover hit, reaching number 88 on the Billboard Hot 100. The song was the secondary theme for World Wrestling Entertainment (WWE) WrestleMania 22 and also used in a promo for WWE Friday Night SmackDown's move to myNetworkTV on October 3, 2008, and was also sung on American Idol by Chris Daughtry.

Chart performance

References

2005 singles
Shinedown songs
Songs written by Brent Smith
2005 songs
Songs written by Tony Battaglia
Atlantic Records singles
Songs written by Brad Stewart